Held up may refer to:

 Robbery
 Held Up, a 1999 film starring Jamie Foxx
 Held Up (soundtrack), a soundtrack album from the film
 Held up (cards), to keep back a high card instead of playing it

See also
 Hold up (disambiguation)